This is a list of the main career statistics of former professional Australian tennis player John Fitzgerald.

Career statistics

Grand Slam finals

Doubles (7 titles, 4 runners-up)

Mixed Doubles (2 titles, 4 runners-up)

Career finals

Singles: 11 (6-5)

Doubles: 61 (30-31)

External links 
 

Fitzgerald, John